Barbara Flynn (born Barbara Joy McMurray, 5 August 1948) is an English actress. She first came to prominence playing Freda Ashton in the ITV drama series A Family at War (1970–1972). She went on to play the milk woman in the BBC comedy Open All Hours (1976–1985), Jill Swinburne in The Beiderbecke Trilogy (1985–1988), Dr. Rose Marie in the BBC series A Very Peculiar Practice (1986–1988), Judith Fitzgerald in the ITV drama Cracker (1993–1995), and Mrs. Jamieson in Cranford (2007–2009). In 2021, she appeared in Doctor Who: Flux as Tecteun, a founder of Time Lord society and The Doctor's adopted mother.

In her own words, she tends to play "feisty, strong women".

Personal life
Flynn was born in St Leonards-on-Sea, Sussex. Her Irish father, Dr James McMurray, was a pathologist. Her mother was Joy (or Joyce) Crawford Hurst. Flynn attended St Mary's Convent School, Hastings. She then trained at the Guildhall School of Music and Drama (where she was awarded the Gold Medal in 1968) before appearing in repertory theatre.

Flynn married television producer and science writer Jeremy Taylor in 1982. The couple had a son, born in 1990. Taylor died on 17 October 2017.

Filmography

Film

Television

Narration
In addition to her acting work, Flynn has provided voice-overs for numerous TV documentaries, including:

 Body Styles (1989)
 Time of Her Life (1993)
 Network First (1996)
 The Lost Gardens of Heligan (1997)
 Deaf Century (1999)
 The 1900 House (1999)
 Horizon (numerous episodes, 2002 to present)
 The 50s and 60s in Living Colour (2003)
 George Orwell: A Life in Pictures (2003)
 From Here to Paternity (2004)
 The Monastery (2005)
 The Ghost in Your Genes (2005)
 Time Shift: Alan Plater (2005)
 The Queen's Castle (2005)
 Guarding the Queen (2007)
 The Restaurant (2008)
 Big Fat Gypsy Weddings (2011 to present)
 Jet! When Britain Ruled the Skies (2012)
 The Flying Scotsman: A Rail Romance (2013)
 The Planners (2013)
 Permission Impossible: Britain's Planners (2014)
 Countdown to Murder (2021)
 Morse and the Last Endeavour (2023)

Theatre work
Flynn appeared in the Birmingham Repertory Theatre production of Pythagoras in 1976. This was a new play by Danny Abse. In 2016 she appeared in the world premiere production of Elegy at the Donmar Warehouse.

References

External links

Barbara Flynn at Curtis Brown

1948 births
Alumni of the Guildhall School of Music and Drama
English film actresses
English television actresses
English voice actresses
English people of Irish descent
Living people
People from Hastings